A3: Rokenrol uzvraća udarac is a 2006 Serbian film.

Plot
At a 1973 Youth Work Action somewhere in SFR Yugoslavia, budding musician Borko Pavić (Nikola Pejaković) is greatly disappointed upon discovering that the majority of his fellow youth workers prefer to dance kolo to folkish accordion sounds rather than listening to him play his acoustic guitar. Heartbroken and depressed, he confides to his best friend about once reading that young people in America make the devil appear by playing their music backward and that the devil then makes them rich and famous. He decides to test the theory and suddenly the devil and angel from the previous Mi nismo anđeli movies materialize and grant him his wishes of women, fame, and fortune. Young Borko thus becomes the mega-popular Yugoslavia-wide rock'n'roll superstar Dorijan.

Cut to 30+ years later, Dorijan is still a debauched, coke-snorting, and alcoholic superstar, except that he's now switched to playing turbo folk instead of rock'n'roll. He lives with a silicone trophy girlfriend Smokvica and his childhood best friend is his business manager. Despite still having his women, fame, and fortune, Dorijan feels creatively boxed in and unhappy about having to play a musical style he hates in order to maintain his affluence.

See also
We Are Not Angels

External links

2006 films
2000s Serbian-language films
Serbian comedy films
2006 comedy films
2006 directorial debut films
The Devil in film
Films set in Belgrade
Films shot in Belgrade